Hassan Al-Sandal  (born September 5, 1987) is a Saudi professional footballer who plays a defender.

Honours
Hajer
Saudi First Division: 2013–14
Saudi Second Division: 2019–20

References

1987 births
Living people
People from Al-Hasa
Saudi Arabian footballers
Al-Adalah FC players
Hajer FC players
Al-Faisaly FC players
Ettifaq FC players
Al-Orobah FC players
Saudi First Division League players
Saudi Second Division players
Saudi Professional League players
Saudi Fourth Division players
Association football defenders
Saudi Arabian Shia Muslims